Seapine Software was a privately held Mason, Ohio-based software and services company. The company developed a suite of software products that managed the full software development lifecycle. Seapine's tools included testing tools, configuration management, test-case management, and requirements management. The company was best known for its TestTrack line of application lifecycle management (ALM) software.

The company was acquired in 2016 by Minneapolis, Minnesota-based Perforce Software, and TestTrack was rebranded as Helix ALM.

History
Seapine was established in 1995 by Rick and Kelly Riccetti. The company shipped their first product, TestTrack Pro, in 1996.

In 2012, Seapine built a new 50,000 square-foot technology headquarters in Mason, OH for their 100+ employees.

In 2016, the company was acquired by Minneapolis, Minnesota-based Perforce Software. Six months after the acquisition, Perforce renamed TestTrack as Helix ALM to match other products in Perforce's suite.

Awards and recognition
Seapine was on the SD Times 100 list in 2006, 2007, 2008, 2009, 2010, 2011, 2012, 2013, 2014, and 2015.

In 2013, Seapine was rated a Champion in the application lifecycle management space by Info-Tech Research Group.

Seapine products had won various Jolt Awards, including its QA Wizard in 2011, Surround SCM in 2008, and TestTrack Studio in 2007.

See also
List of revision control software
Comparison of issue tracking systems

References

External links 
 
 Quality and Transparent ALM

Development software companies